Paolo Lepori (born April 20, 1959) is an Italian sprint canoer who competed in the late 1970s. At the 1976 Summer Olympics in Montreal, he was eliminated in the semifinals of the K-2 500 m event.

References
Sports-reference.com profile

External links

1959 births
Canoeists at the 1976 Summer Olympics
Italian male canoeists
Living people
Olympic canoeists of Italy
Place of birth missing (living people)